Micky or Mickie can be a given name, but it is most often a nickname for Michael or non-Anglo Saxon equivalents, such as "Mikhail". People with the name include:

Men
 Micky Adams (born 1961), English football manager and former player
 Micky Arison (born 1949), Chief Executive Officer of Carnival Corporation
 Micky Dolenz (born 1945), American actor, musician, and television and theatre director
 Micky Dore (1883–1910), Australian rugby union and rugby league player
 Micky Droy (born 1951), English retired footballer
 Micky Hazard (born 1960), English retired footballer
 Mickie Henson (1963-2022), American professional wrestling referee
 Micky Horswill (born 1953), British professional footballer
 Micky Mellon (born 1972), Scottish football manage and former player
 Micky Moody (born 1950), English guitarist
 Micky Quinn (born 1962), English retired footballer
 Micky Lee Soule (born 1946), American musician, founding member of Ritchie Blackmore's Rainbow
 Micky Stewart (born 1932), English former cricketer, coach and administrator
 Micky Waller (1941–2008), English rock and blues drummer
 Micky Ward (born 1965), American retired professional boxer
 Micky Yoochun, the former stage name of Park Yoo-chun (born 1986), Korean singer who was a member of the boy band TVXQ
 Sweet Micky, stage name of Michel Martelly (born 1961), Haitian musician and former President of Haiti (2011–2016)

Women
 Delia Akeley (1869–1970), American explorer
 Micky Levy, Israeli-American screenwriter and cinema actress

See also
 Mickey and Mickey (disambiguation)
 Mick (disambiguation)